Charna Island (also spelled Churna Island) is located near Mubarak Goth, Kiamari Town in Karachi, Sindh, Pakistan. Charna is also locally known "Cheerno". It is 6 km away from Mubarak Village. Fishermen from Mubarak Goth go fishing near Charna Island. Mubarak Goth is the second largest fisherman locality in Karachi; nevertheless, it lacks basic amenities including education, health care, jetties, ownership rights and communication. On August 04, 2020, Pakistan has released a new political map that first time shows the Islands of Churna and Astola.

Background
Churna is mostly used as a firing range by the Pakistan Navy. It is also used by tourists for activities such as scuba diving, freediving, underwater photography, hiking, speed boating, kneeboarding, wakesurfing, banana tubing, jet skiing, cliff diving and snorkeling.

The area surrounding Charna is popular for scuba diving because of the presence of widely varied marine life and different kinds of coral reef.  According to Yousuf Ali, founder of the Karachi Scuba Diving Centre, "there are more than 60 types of corals found near Charna waters and many new corals started to flourish" after the 2004 Indian Ocean tsunami. Jellyfish are found in large numbers during October.

Wildlife
On 14 September 2017, a mother blue whale was spotted near the island along with her calf. The mother was 17 meters in length. This was a first sighting of a living blue whale in the Pakistani sea, as previous blue whales were just beached skeletons of the dead whales; the last specimen had been observed at Khuddi Creek along the coast of Sindh in August 2014. There have been 47 sightings of baleen whales in this area but none of them were blue whales.
On 22 November 2017, a killer whale was spotted near the island, a rare sighting as killer whales are found in deep water, whereas the depth of the water where the whale was sighted was only 72 meters deep. It was also the first sighting of a killer whale in the Karachi area since 2003.
Other marine life around Charna includes the yellow-bellied sea snake, great barracuda, narrow-barred Spanish mackerel, cobia, mahi-mahi, skipjack tuna, angel fish, sea urchin, sea fan, oyster, ray fish and rare green turtle. The Pakistan Game Fishing Association (PGFA) holds national angling competitions near Charna. It is the presence of coral reefs around this island that attracts the number of big game fish around it. However, illegal net sizes used by fishing trawlers are destroying this natural treasure.

See also
List of islands of Pakistan

References

Uninhabited islands of Pakistan
Islands of Sindh